Legoland is a Legoland-themed construction and management simulation video game that was released on 1 May 2000. It shares many aspects with the RollerCoaster Tycoon series (a similar series of games with an identical premise) but with a more simplistic and child-friendly gameplay style. The voicework is provided by Justin Fletcher.

Story

The opening scene begins with a message on the player's answering machine telling them that they have been chosen to be the  Park Manager. The scene transfers to the Legoland Park, where Jonathan Ablebody, a member of staff at the Park, is sitting in the control room, announcing that Professor Voltage has built a new invention. The announcement simultaneously introduces the supporting characters: Bob Longtree the gardener, JP the mechanic, and Rosie the chef.  

Once the player arrives at the Park, they are shown through to a hall, with staff and visitors.  A stage curtain is pulled back, and Professor Voltage introduces his new time machine.  As the time machine gets stuck while rising through the stage floor,  Jonathan comments that the machine will never work.  But after a quick repair, Professor Voltage fires the time machine up, smoke billows and light blasts through the building, and the machine disappears. 

After a brief moment, the time machine reappears and stops spinning abruptly. As the battered building crumbles, the Professor stumbles off the machine and is hit on the head by his Duplicator Ray.  He realizes that the park, which has been destroyed by the effects of his experiment, can be rebuilt and improved using his Duplicator Ray and time machine.  Jonathan remarks that he hopes it will work out and welcomes the player once again into Legoland.

Gameplay

Story Mode 
In Story Mode, the player must complete five tutorial levels to learn how to play, then must complete ten Miniland levels to rebuild the Park. When the game is completed, the player is rewarded with a certificate that they can print out. Story Mode also features cutscenes that illustrate Professor Voltage traveling back in time and discovering new buildings, rides, and park themes all while using his Duplicator Ray to collect hologram-like copies of them.

Free Play Mode 
In Free Play Mode, the player can create their own Legoland park without any objectives or limitations on money or time, but can only use sets they have unlocked up to that point and with a limit on the number of rides, decorations, and restaurants that can be placed. Completing the game in Story Mode gives the player access to all unlockables in Free Play Mode.

Reception
Legoland received favorable reviews, earning a score of 80.5% at rating site GameRankings.

References

2000 video games
Amusement park simulation games
Krisalis Software games
Legoland (video game)
Single-player video games
Video games developed in the United Kingdom
Video games with isometric graphics
Windows games
Windows-only games
Works based on amusement park attractions